Military Institute of Science and Technology (MIST) is a public engineering university in Bangladesh located at Mirpur Cantonment, Dhaka. MIST is a government engineering and technological research institution under the Ministry of Defence. Government of the People's Republic of Bangladesh established it in 1998 for providing B.Sc Engineering, M.Sc / M. Engineering, M.Phil and PhD degrees in Engineering. MIST is a PhD granting public research university in Bangladesh specialized in Engineering. MIST is well equipped with advanced engineering laboratories and research facilities for the fulfillment of country's technological needs. All departments have achieved accreditation from Board of Accreditation for Engineering & Technical Education (BAETE), Institution of Engineers, Bangladesh (IEB), for excellence in high quality of engineering education.

MIST conducts twelve Engineering and Architecture departments under four faculties. A candidate has to undergo through a rigorous written admissions test for getting a chance for admission in MIST. Only short listed number of eligible candidates can participate in the written admissions test based on their results in secondary (SSC) and higher secondary (HSC) level.

History
MIST came into existence on 19 April 1998 and academic programs were launched in January 1999. The initial batches included only selected military students. However, feeling the necessity of spreading quality engineering education, the authority decided to admit civil students (both male and female) and from 2002, civilian students were admitted in different departments through passing a rigorous admission test.

The maiden department of the institute was the Civil Engineering department, which started functioning in 1999. In 2000, Computer Science & Engineering (CSE) department was established. Mechanical Engineering (ME) department and Electrical, Electronic & Communication Engineering (EECE) department were established in the year 2003. MIST started its Masters program in different disciplines from 2012 and MPhil/PhD from year 2014.

In the beginning MIST was affiliated with the University of Dhaka (DU).

Campus
MIST is located at Mirpur Cantonment, on the northwest edge of Dhaka City. Students' hall and teachers' quarters are at the last end of the campus. This area is confined, with officers' mess, four tower buildings, cafeteria, library, two fields for the civil students, medical center, physical center and administrative buildings. Halls for students and teachers are situated outside the campus. Recently more land was issued for the campus for residential accommodation.

Student's dress
Civil students are to wear dress with displayed identity card as per 'Dress Code' prescribed by MIST authority. Military students put on uniform as per Dress Regulation of respective services.

Affiliation
MIST was previously affiliated with the University of Dhaka. However, at present all academic programs of MIST are affiliated with Bangladesh University of Professionals (BUP). All examinations are conducted as per the schedule approved by BUP. It also approves the results and awards certificates to the qualified students.

Procedure of admission
The undergraduate admission process at MIST has several steps. First, students are screened based on their grade point average (GPA) in HSC or equivalent examinations. Every year, 10,000 candidates are short-listed from approximately 20,000-20,500 applicants to sit for the admission test. Besides the admission test, SSC and HSC results are taken into consideration while evaluating candidates. Students who have passed in minimum five subjects in GCE O-Level and three subjects (mathematics, physics and chemistry) in A-Level, obtaining minimum C-grades in all subjects are also eligible for the admission test. Foreign students may be admitted against a reserved quota of 3% of overall vacancies available (6% of civil seats). Vacancies will be offered to countries through Armed Forces Division (AFD), Prime Minister's Office, of the Government of Bangladesh. Admission to Ph.D. and M.Phil. programs requires a master's degree from relevant branch from a recognized university. Admission to a Master's program requires a bachelor's degree in engineering from a recognized institution. Admission is based on written admission test & interview/viva voce on the relevant departments. Admission is highly competitive in postgraduate programs as only few aspirants are selected every year from a large pool of applicants.

Academics

Faculties and departments
Academic activities are undertaken by 12 departments under four faculties. Twelve departments offer undergraduate programs.

Postgraduate programs
Eight departments of MIST offer postgraduate courses(M.Sc./M.Engg., Ph.D.) and other three departments of Science and Engineering Faculty offer M.Phil.
 Civil Engineering [Structure/Transportation/Environment/Water Resource/Geotechnical Engineering] (M.Sc./M.Engg., Ph.D.)
 Electrical, Electronics & Communication Engineering [Power/Electronics/Communication] (M.Sc./M.Engg., Ph.D.)
 Computer Science & Engineering (M.Sc./M.Engg., Ph.D.)
 Mechanical Engineering (M.Sc./M.Engg., Ph.D.)
 Naval Architecture and Marine Engineering (M.Sc./M.Engg., Ph.D.)
 Aeronautical Engineering (M.Sc./M.Engg., Ph.D.)
 Nuclear Science & Engineering (M.Sc./M.Engg., Ph.D.)
 Biomedical Engineering (M.Sc./M.Engg.)

Diploma courses
 Certificate Course on GIS and Remote Sensing
 Diploma courses in surveying & mapping
 Diploma & Certificate courses in CSE.
 Professional advance courses.

Regulatory bodies

Council of MIST

Chairman 
 Honourable Minister, Ministry of Education, Government of the People's Republic of Bangladesh.

Vice chairman 
 Chief of Army Staff, Bangladesh Army
 Chief of Naval Staff, Bangladesh Navy
 Chief of Air Staff, Bangladesh Air Force

Members 
 Principal Staff Officer, Armed Forces Division (AFD)
 Secretary, MOD
 Vice Chancellor(VC), BUP
 Engineer in Chief(E in C), Army Headquarters(AHQ)
 Commandant, MIST
 Commandant, BMA
 Commandant, BNA
 Commandant, BAFA
 Representative of the VC(Prof eqvt), Faculty of science, DU
 Representative of the VC(Prof eqvt), BUET
 All Dean's of Faculty (CE, ECE, ME, and Sc & Engg), MIST
 Representative of the Ministry of Education
 Representative of the Ministry of Finance
 Representative of the Ministry of Science and Technology

Member secretary 
 Colonel Staff, MIST

Governing Body of MIST

Chairman 
 E in C, Bangladesh Army/ Commandant, MIST(As per seniority)

Vice chairman 
 E in C, Bangladesh Army/ Commandant, MIST(As per seniority)

Members 
 Representative of the VC, Faculty of Science, DU
 Representative of the VC, BUET
 Representative of the VC, BUP
 Dean/ Senior Instructor appointed by Commandant BMA / Commandant MIST
 Dean/ Senior Instructor appointed by Commandant BNA / Commandant MIST
 Dean/ Senior Instructor appointed by Commandant BAFA / Commandant MIST
 Director General, Training Directorate, AFD
 Director, Military Training, Bangladesh Army
 Director, Naval Training,  Bangladesh Navy
 Director, Air Training,  Bangladesh Air Force
 All Dean's of Faculty (CE, ECE, ME, and Sc & Engg), MIST
 Director, Research & Development (R&D), MIST
 Director Administration, MIST
 Representative of MOD
 Representative of Ministry of Education
 Representative of the Ministry of Finance
 Representative of the Ministry of Post, Telecommunication and Information Technology

Member secretary 
 Colonel Staff, MIST

Academic Council of MIST

Chairman 
 Commandant, MIST

Members 
 Representative of the VC, Faculty of Science, DU
 Representative of the VC, BUET
 Representative of the VC, BUP
 All Dean's of Faculty (CE, ECE, ME, and Sc & Engg), MIST
 Representative of Commandant, Engineering Faculty, BMA
 Representative of Commandant, Engineering Faculty, BNA
 Representative of Commandant, Engineering Faculty, BAFA
 Director, Research & Development (R&D), MIST
 Heads of all department, MIST
 Colonel Staff, MIST
 Controller of Exam, MIST
 Representative of Training Directorate, AFD
 Representative of Military Training Directorate, AHQ
 Representative of Naval Training Directorate, NHQ
 Representative of Air Training Directorate, Air HQ
 Representative of MOD
 Representative of Ministry of Education

Member secretary 
 General Staff Officer Grade-1 (Academic), MIST

Committee for Advance Studies and Research

Chairman 
 Commandant, MIST

Members 
 Senior Instructors / Professors from BUET appointed by Commandant, MIST
 Senior Instructors / Professors from MIST appointed by Commandant, MIST
 Dean, Centre for Higher Studies and Research, BUP
 Director, Academic Wing, MIST
 All Deans of Faculty (CE, ECE, ME, and Sc & Engg), MIST
 Director, Research & Development (R&D), MIST
 Heads of all department, MIST
 Controller of Exam, MIST

Member secretary 
 Convener, Postgraduate Academic Wing, MIST

Number of seats 
The number of seats for 4-year bachelor's degree in Engineering Programmes (Unit-A) and 5-year bachelor's degree of Architecture Programme (Unit-B) is given below:

Facilities and services

Teacher's quarters 
MIST has two teacher's quarters for the permanent teachers with families. They are:
 Polash (পলাশ)
 Shapla (শাপলা)

Halls of residence 
MIST has dorms for male and female students. Hostel administration is performed by the provost who is selected from one of the senior teachers of the 11 departments. The hall organizes many creative works and tournaments.

Osmany Hall
Osmany Hall is named after the Bangabir General M.A.G. Osmany, the Commander-in-chief of Bangladesh forces during Bangladesh Liberation War in 1971. Osmany Hall is an 8 stored building with female and male wings, having a capacity of 558 students (male 260 and female 298). There are 20 staff for each wing. Osmany Hall is known for the security of the students compared to the other hall in the country. Students get various modern facilities such as 24-hour electricity, internet service, gym, games and sports facilities.

Laboratory facilities 
Each department is equipped with modern lab facilities. The various laboratories available under each dept are given below:

CE Dept
 Environmental Engineering Lab
 Geo-technical Engineering Lab
 Structural Mechanics Lab
 Concrete Lab
 Transportation Engineering Lab
 Water Resource Engineering Lab
 Survey & Mapping Lab
 Estimating & Drawing Shop

EECE Dept
 Electrical Circuit Laboratory
 Electrical Circuit Simulation Laboratory
 Computer Programming Laboratory
 Electrical Machine Laboratory
 Power System Laboratory
 Electronics & Digital Electronics Laboratory
 Electronics Circuit Simulation Laboratory
 Power Electronics Laboratory
 Instrumentation & Measurement Laboratory
 Communication Laboratory
 Digital Signal Processing Laboratory
 Microprocessor and interfacing Laboratory
 Control System Laboratory
 Switch Gear & Protection Laboratory
 VLSI Laboratory
 Digital Communication Laboratory
 Power System Protection Laboratory
 Microwave Engineering Laboratory
 Numerical Methods Laboratory
 High Voltage Engineering Laboratory

CSE Dept
 Network Laboratory
 Software Engineering Laboratory
 Artificial Intelligence and VLSI Laboratory
 Micro Processor and Micro Controller Laboratory
 Digital Laboratory
 Interfacing Laboratory
 Image Processing Laboratory
 Multimedia and Graphics Laboratory

ME Dept
 Measurement & Quality Control Laboratory
 Thermodynamics Laboratory
 Refrigeration & Air Conditioning Laboratory
 Heat Transfer Laboratory
 Energy Laboratory
 Machine Tools Laboratory
 Material Production Process Laboratory
 Drawing Shop (CAD Lab)
 Heat Engine Laboratory
 Applied Mechanics Laboratory
 Fluid Mechanics Laboratory

AE Dept
 Aerodynamics Lab
 Applied Aerodynamics Lab
 Aero-Fluid Mechanics and Machinery Lab
 Aero-structure Lab
 Material Science Lab
 Aerospace Ground Equipment Lab
 Control (Mechatronics) Lab
 Machine Tools Lab
 Propulsion (Aero-engine) Lab
 Test and Measurement Lab
 CAD (Computer Aided Design) Lab
 Vibration and Noise Control Lab
 Aero-Non-Destructive Testing and Evaluation (NDTE) Lab
 Strength of Material Lab
 Avionics and Ground Electronics Lab
 Aero-Electrical and Electro-Mechanical Lab
 Airborne Electronics Lab
 Radar Engineering Lab
 Microwave Communication Lab
 Electronic Warfare (EW) & Stealth Technique Lab
 Aero-Satellite Communication & Remote Sensing Lab
 Aero-Weapon System Lab
 Aero Control (Dynamic Stability) Engineering Lab
 Digital Signal Processing (DSP) Lab
 Aero-Instrumentation (Avionics) Lab

NAME Dept
 Ship Design Laboratory
 Marine Machinery Laboratory
 Computer Aided Ship Design Laboratory
 Heat Engine Laboratory
 Ship Structure & Fabrication Laboratory
 Instrumentation Laboratory
 Refrigeration & Air Conditioning Laboratory
 Fluid Mechanics Laboratory
 Applied Mechanics Laboratory

NSE Dept
 Modeling and Simulation Lab
 Health/Nuclear Physics Lab
 Radiation lmedical physics Lab
 Radiochemical Lab

Science & Humanities Dept
 Physics Lab
 Chemistry Lab

Central library 
Overview of Library: Central library was established in 1999. The Central
library of the Military Institute of Science and Technology (MIST) can also be
hailed as the heart of the institute. It aims to provide quality knowledge and useful
resources to the users of the institute. The library is well-organized in terms of its
presently available resources. The library plans to incorporate more advanced
technology into its functioning in the near future. The MIST Central Library is
committed to serving the institution and society. The library follows the Open
Access System. In order to the academic and research needs of the faculty,
research, scholars, students and staff officers. The library of MIST is a collection
of knowledge and built up a blanched and rich collection in Science and
Technology. It is an open library system for the student of MIST, which provides a
rich collection of e-resources, and books, including journals, newsletters, thesis works
and CDs. Student ID cards stand as a library card. The student can borrow any
unlimited textbook from the library for 6 months and 5 other reference books for
30 days. At present, the library has more than 65,000 books, 9.8 million+ online books & Journals,
1,670 CDs, thesis paper 2,093 and repository items about 423, and a reading room
sitting capacity of more than 120. The book stock is arranged in a classified
sequence based on the Dewey Decimal systems (DDC), and the great majority of
volumes in the library are on open shelves, available for borrowing. MIST Central
The library has an “Integrated Library System” using open-source software Koha,
DSpace, VuFind, and PHP; and now the systems are fully operational i.e.,
students are now getting the modern facilities. The library has a well-equipped
cyber centre through which the students and faculty can search for the e-resource
that they require. It also subscribes to a number of Bangla and English newspapers and periodicals. 
In addition to that, each dept has its own library enriched with adequate text and reference books. 
Start off each semester library issues reference books for that particular semester to students of every department. 
There is also a Cyber Center for Internet browsing.

Service:
Following services are being rendered from the Central Library, MIST. All
registered members of the library users are stakeholders of these services.
a. Circulation Service
b. Web OPAC Facility
c. E-Resources Retrieval Facility
d. Current Awareness Services of newly acquired books and other
resources.
e. Reference / Information Service
f. Email & SMS Alert Service
g. Reading Facilities
h. Book Issue Facilities for Long & Short time.
i. Access to E-Book and E-Journals
j. Audio-Visual Material issue Facilities
k. Photocopy Services
l. Browsing & printing facilities through Cyber Centre
m. Wi-Fi Service
n. Reading facilities of Thesis paper, Journal, Magazine and Newspaper
o. Plagiarism Checking Facilities
p. Parapresing & Grammarly Checking Facilities

Library Organization:
a. Administrative Section
b. Acquisition Section
c. Processing Section and Classification Section
d. Circulation Section and Lending Section
e. Reference Section
f. Reprographic and Audio Visual Section
g. Text Book Section
h. Archive Section
i. Cyber Section
j. Classified Section
k. ICT Section
l. Family Corner Section
m. Liberation War Corner
n. Store Section

MIST journals and magazines 
 MIST has an annual technical journal titled "Galaxy" whose concern is to provide a firm ground for students and faculty members to share their research outcome and knowledge.
 "The Sail"- Annual magazine published by the students of Naval Architecture and Marine Engineering Department.It has been published 5 editions (as of 2021).
 "IMPULSE"-Annual publication from Dept. of Electrical, Electronic and Communication Engineering. So far, there are 6 editions of this illustrious magazine.
 Osmany Hall Magazine "Prottasha(প্রত্যাশা)"
 "AEROMIST"-A departmental magazine of Aeronautical Engineering department.

Osmany Memorial Gold Medal 
Awarded to the best student amongst all the MIST Medal holders.

MIST Medal 
Awarded to first position holder in each department with a minimum CGPA of 3.80 out of 4.00.

Research Medal 
Awarded to the student of different departments for the best Research work in their Graduation.

Dean's List of Honour 
 All students earning CGPA ≥ 3.75 at the end of each academic level for level 1, 2 and 3
 All graduating students earning CGPA ≥ 3.75 considering results of entire program (level 1 to 4)

Scholarships and stipends
 Chancellor's(BUP) Scholarship
 Vice Chancellors (BUP) Scholarship/ Stipend
 MIST Scholarship
 MIST Stipends
 Osmany Memorial Trust Scholarship
 Buro Bangladesh Stipend
 Chief of Army Staff Scholarship
 Chief of Army Staff Stipend
 Chief of Naval Staff Scholarship
 Chief of Air Staff Scholarship
 Brig Gen Kamal Scholarship
 Brig Gen Kamal Stipend

Achievements
 Md Mijanur Rahman (AE-1) Won Runner-Up Trophy in "International Public Speaking Competition-2010" held in England.
 MIST programming contest teams MIST_Kernel participated in the "4th IUT ICT Fest-2012", placed 8th( 5th in institution ranking).
 MIST programming contest teams MIST_Kernel participated in the "ACM International Collegiate Programming Contest Dhaka Regional 2012", achieved 17th position ( 9th in institution ranking).
 MIST Lunabotics Team participated in "3rd Annual Lunabotics Mining Competition 2012" held in Kennedy Space Center, Florida, USA.
 Mobile Apps "Save Life" developed by the Students (Ishtiak Ahmed & Kazi Munshimun Nabi) of CSE Dept of MIST secured 2nd runner-up position in the Mobile Apps Development Contest by EATL Apps among 188 projects.
 MIST Aero Thunder Team participated in "SAE Aero Design Competition(West)-2013" & placed 19th position in world ranking, held in California, USA from 12 to 14 April 2013.
 Two Teams from CE Dept.(Team VIVE & Team STORM) participated in "ACI Mortar Workability Competition 2013" held in Minneapolis, Minnesota, USA on 14 April and Team VIVE placed 4th among all the universities & 1st contestant from Bangladesh & whole Asia.
 Team "MIST Dreamer's Fin" from Aeronautical Engineering Dept. participated in 2013 AIAA/Cessna Aircraft Company/Raytheon Missile Systems Design/Build/Fly Competition held in Tucson, Arizona, US, from 19 to 21 April 2013 & placed 40 out of 90 team from all over the world (placed 4th in whole ASIA region). "MIST Dreamer's Fin" is the 1st team from Bangladesh participate this competition.
 MIST Team "BIJOY" became Runners up of the Inter University Design Contest-UAPT jointly organized by Engineering Students Association of Bangladesh(ESAB) & Bangladeshi Systems Change Advocacy Network (B-SCAN) among 82 teams from all over the country on 10 May 2013.
 MIST Lunabotics Team "EKUSH" participated in the "4th Annual Lunabotics Mining Competition 2013" held in Kennedy Space Center, Florida, USA & placed 11th in mining Category all over world. And won 1st position in 'Outreach Project',1st in 'Luna World Wide Award'  2nd in 'System Engineering Paper' & 3rd in 'Team Spirit Award'.
 "MIST Aero Thunder Team GREEN" participated in "SAE Aero Design Competition (WEST)-2014" & placed 17th position among 100 universities all over the world. And also placed 4th position in payload section & 10th in flight score
 "MIST Aero Thunder Team RED" participated in "SAE Aero Design Competition(East)-2014" & placed 10th position in world ranking, held in USA from 11 to 13 April 2014. They also placed 5th position in System Engineering Paper & 5th position in Presentation.

References

External links 
 Mist computer club website
 Mist robotics club

Public engineering universities of Bangladesh
Technological institutes of Bangladesh
Universities of science and technology in Bangladesh
Bangladesh University of Professionals
Educational institutions established in 1998
Military education and training in Bangladesh
Educational Institutions affiliated with Bangladesh Army
1998 establishments in Bangladesh